Troubles is the second album by Steve Lacy to be released on the Italian Black Saint label. It features performances of five of Lacy's compositions by Lacy, Steve Potts, Irene Aebi, Kent Carter and Oliver Johnson.

Reception
The Allmusic review by Scott Yanow awarded the album 4½ stars stating "This fairly obscure effort from the Steve Lacy Quintet of 1979 features the great soprano saxophonist in typically exploratory yet thoughtful form on five originals. His interplay with the underrated altoist Steve Potts (who doubles on soprano) is the main reason to acquire the set, while violinist/vocalist Irene Aebi's contributions are typically eccentric and an acquired taste. Bassist Kent Carter and drummer Oliver Johnson are stimulating throughout, particularly in support of the vocal choir on the precious serious/hilarious title track and the more stern "No Baby" ".

Track listing
 "Troubles" - 6:34
 "Wasted" - 10:07
 "The Whammies!" - 2:58
 "Blues" - 12:52
 "No Baby" - 6:07

All compositions by Steve Lacy
Recorded at Barigozzi Studios, Milan, Italy on May 24 and 25, 1979

Personnel
Steve Lacy - soprano saxophone
Steve Potts - alto and soprano saxophones
Irene Aebi - cello, violin, vocals
Kent Carter - bass, cello
Oliver Johnson - drums

References 

1979 albums
Steve Lacy (saxophonist) albums
Black Saint/Soul Note albums